Oliverio is a given name and a surname. Notable people with the name include:

Given name
Oliverio Carafa (1430–1511), Italian cardinal and diplomat of the Renaissance
Oliverio Castañeda (1955–1978), Guatemalan left-wing oriented student leader
Oliverio Girondo (1891–1967), Argentine poet
Oliverio Jesus Alvarez Gonzalez (born 1972), known as Oli, Spanish retired footballer
Pedro Oliverio Guerrero (1970–2010), Colombian drug lord and the former leader of ERPAC
Oliverio Pinto or Olivério Pinto (1896–1981), Brazilian zoologist and physician
Oliverio Popovitch (born 1911), Brazilian rower
Oliverio Rincón (born 1968), Colombian former road bicycle racer

Surname
Alberto Oliverio (born 1938), biologist and psycho-biologist
Alessandro Oliverio (1500–1544), Italian painter
Donato Oliverio (born 1956), Bishop of the Eparchy of Lungro, Calabria, Italy
James Oliverio, American composer of film scores and contemporary classical music
Mario Oliverio (born 1953), Italian politician
Mike Oliverio (born 1963), former State Senator, 2010 Democratic nominee for West Virginia
Pierluigi Oliverio (born 1969), the District 6 Council member on the San Jose City Council
Simone Oliverio (died 1668), Roman Catholic prelate, Bishop of Fondi (1662–1668)

See also
Oliver (disambiguation)
Oliveri
Olivio (disambiguation)